Prasanna is a 1950 Indian Malayalam-language film, directed by S. M. Sriramulu Naidu and produced by Pakshiraja Studios. The film stars Pappukutty Bhagavathar, Kottarakkara Sreedharan Nair and P. A. Thomas in lead roles. The film had musical score by M. S. Gnanamani. It is debut Malayalam film of Travancore Sisters, Lalitha, Padmini and Ragini. Also the debut film of actors Kandiyoor Parameshwarankutty, P. A. Thomas, Pappukkutty Bhagavathar, debut Malayalam film of Sreeramulu Naidu, playback singers M. L. Vasantha Kumari, P. A. Periyanayiki and Radha-Jayalakshmi.

Cast
 Kottarakkara Sreedharan Nair
 Pappukutty Bhagavathar
 Kandiyoor Parameshwaran Pillai
 P. A. Thomas
 TS Bharadwaj
 Lalitha
 Padmini
 Ragini
 Kanchana
 Radhamani

References

External links
 

1950 films
1950s Malayalam-language films
Films directed by S. M. Sriramulu Naidu
Films scored by M. S. Gnanamani